Carabus hummeli vladobydovi is a subspecies of ground beetle in the subfamily Carabinae that is endemic to Russia, where it can only be found in Primorsky Krai. The species are brownish-red coloured.

References

hummeli vladobydovi
Beetles described in 2007
Endemic fauna of Primorsky Krai